Youlden is an English surname. Notable people with this name include:
 Chris Youlden (born 1943), English blues singer
 Joe Youlden (1883–1959), Australian rules footballer
 Luke Youlden (born 1978), Australian motor racing driver
 Tommy Youlden, (born 1949), English footballer

English-language surnames